Ansis Regža (born 26 July 1963 in Riga) is a Latvian curler and curling coach.

At the national level, as of 2022, he is a 2003 Latvian men's champion, three-time Latvian mixed champion curler (2011, 2016, 2018) and two-time Latvian mixed doubles champion curler (2009, 2013).

Teams

Men's

Mixed

Mixed doubles

Record as a coach of national teams

Personal life
She is from family of Latvian curlers. His wife Dace is also a curler and curling coach. Their daughters, Evita Regža and Anete Zābere also are curlers.

References

External links

Video: 

Living people
1963 births
Sportspeople from Riga
Latvian male curlers
Latvian curling champions
Latvian curling coaches
20th-century Latvian people